"Wiggle" is a song by American singer Jason Derulo featuring American rapper Snoop Dogg, released as the fourth single from the former's third U.S. studio album, Talk Dirty (2014) in North America. In Europe, the song was released as the sixth single from his third international album, Tattoos and the first single from the special edition of the album.

Background and composition
"Wiggle" was written by Jason Derulo in collaboration with Eric Frederic, Axident, Jacob Kasher, Sean Douglas, John Ryan, Joe Spargur, and Snoop Dogg. Production for the song was handled by Ricky Reed, Honua Music and Axident. The former previously produced Derulo's worldwide hit single, "Talk Dirty". It was recorded at Serenity West Recording in Los Angeles, Tha Compound in Los Angeles and at Start From Infinity "Joshua Tree Sessions" and mixed by Manny Marroquin.

Producers Ricky Reed, Honua Music and Axident used toy flutes, hand clappers, peanut wrappers, and percussive instruments as sound effects.

Jason Derulo chose to collaborate with Snoop Dogg because he "is the coolest, most swagged-out rapper there is. He's iconic, and I wanted to go for a more iconic look for this one." Derulo approached him while they were at an All-Star game. Once he heard the song, Snoop Dogg sent Derulo a message saying: "This is crazy. I'll get back to you in 48 hours". "That's exactly what happened", Derulo  explained.

MTV News' Christina Garibaldi described "Wiggle" as an "upbeat club-ready song that's all about a woman's 'big fat butt.'"

Music video
A music video for the song was released on YouTube on May 21, 2014. It was directed by Colin Tilley and features a cameo appearance from R&B singer Ne-Yo.

Critical reception
"Wiggle" received mixed-to-negative reviews from music critics. The song was on Spin'''s list of "The 101 Best Songs of 2014". In a negative review,  "Wiggle" was named one of the 10 worst songs of 2014 by Time.

Live performances
On July 4, 2014, Derulo performed "Wiggle" on Good Morning America as part of its Summer Concert Series. On August 10, 2014, Derulo performed the song at the 2014 Teen Choice Awards. Variety'' described the song as a highlight of the ceremony.

Commercial performance
The song peaked at number 5 on the Billboard Hot 100, making it Derulo's fifth and Snoop Dogg's fourteenth top 10 single on the chart. As of October 2014, the single has sold 1,663,000 copies in the United States.

Track listing
German CD single
"Wiggle"
"Wiggle" (instrumental)
Digital download — remix
"Wiggle" (TWRK remix) – 3:52

Charts

Weekly charts

Year-end charts

Certifications

Release history

See also
List of number-one R&B/hip-hop songs of 2014 (U.S.)
List of UK R&B Chart number-one singles of 2014
List of Airplay 100 number ones of the 2010s

References

2013 songs
2014 singles
Jason Derulo songs
Snoop Dogg songs
Warner Records singles
Music videos directed by Colin Tilley
Number-one singles in Romania
Songs written by Jason Derulo
Songs written by Snoop Dogg
Songs written by Jacob Kasher
Songs written by Sean Douglas (songwriter)
Songs written by Axident
Songs written by Ricky Reed
Songs written by John Ryan (musician)
Songs written by Joe London
Song recordings produced by Joe London
Pop-rap songs
Trap music songs
American dance-pop songs